Peroor Sree Krishna Swamy Temple is an ancient Hindu Temple situated near Ambalamukku in Thiruvananthapuram Municipal Corporation. Ambalamukku Jn is 6 km from Thiruvananthapuram central Bus Stand and Railway Station. The temple is dedicated to Lord Sree Krishna and is administered by Travancore Devaswom Board. Peroorkada's name came from this holy temple. The temple is famous as 'Thekkan Guruvayoor'. (The word 'thekkan' means 'southern').

Deities and sub-deities
The main deity of this temple is Lord Sree Krishna. Sub-deities include Ganapathi, Shiva, Bhagavathy, Ayyappan, Muruga, Nagas and Navagrahas.

Festivals
The annual festival continues for ten days. It begins by hoisting the flag on the golden flagstaff on Thiruvonam Star day in the Malayalam month of Meenam and finishes by Aarattu on the tenth day. The Aarattu ritual is held at Sasthamangalam Mahadevar Temple premises and on that evening a spectacular procession continues from the temple. The procession goes along Peroorkada, Paipinmoodu Jn, Kadappathala Nagar, Kowdiar, Ambalamukku Jn, and back to the temple. Sree Krishna Jayanthi, Mandala, Makara Vilakku season etc. are celebrated.

Main offerings
Payasam, Paalpayasam (sweetened milk porridge), Archana, Pushpanjali, (flower offerings), Neeranjanam, Muzhukappu, Ganapathi Homam, Bhagavathy Homam and many more offerings are made. Annadanam (feast) is performed during festival days.

See also

 Ambalappuzha Sri Krishna Temple
 Neyyattinkara Sree Krishna Swami Temple
 Sasthamangalam Mahadevar Temple
 Peroorkada

References

Hindu temples in Thiruvananthapuram district